Shijiazhuang Zhengding International Airport  is the primary airport serving Shijiazhuang, the capital of Hebei province, China. The airport is the hub for Hebei Airlines and a focus city for both China United Airlines and Spring Airlines. It is also one of the few airports in China that Antonov An-225 was able to operate.

History
Shijiazhuang Zhengding Airport was opened in 1995. It was renamed to Shijiazhuang Zhengding International Airport in July 2008.

Due to the COVID-19 pandemic, flights bound for Beijing were being redirected to Shijiazhuang and other nearby airports to minimize imported cases.

Airlines and destinations

Passenger

Cargo

Ground transportation

Inter-terminal transportation 
The airport provides a free inter-terminal shuttle bus between Terminals 1/2 and Zhengding Airport railway station. They operate every 30 minutes from 6:30 am to 8:30 pm.

Rail 
The Beijing–Guangzhou–Shenzhen–Hong Kong High-Speed Railway passes within about 3 km south of the airport's terminal. A few trains a day stop at Zhengding Airport railway station, providing convenient service to Shijiazhuang railway station and a few other key stations in the Beijing/Hebei/Henan/Shanxi region.

It takes under 15 minutes for a D- or G-series train to travel from Zhengding Airport railway station to Shijiazhuang railway station.

Shijiazhuang Airport Authority views the railway as an important tool to attract passengers to the airport not just from Shijiazhuang, but from the wider region as well. They have announced a program providing air passengers flying to Shijiazhuang with free train tickets to station such as Beijing West and Zhengzhou; passengers arriving to the airport by train and leaving by plane can have the cost of their train tickets reimbursed as well.

Bus 
There are 5 bus routes to and from points throughout the city including Hebei Stadium, Jinyuan Hotel, Shijiazhuang Railway Station, Dongkaifaqu, Hoton Hotel. The airport buses run to each of the two terminals and cost up to ¥20 per ride depending on the route. The airport buses accept only paper tickets that are sold at each terminal and certain bus stops in the city. The airport also offers inter-city bus services to and from neighboring cities including Baoding, Dingzhou, Anguo, Gaoyang, Xiong'an, Baigou, Xingtai, Hengshui, Anping, Shenzhou, Handan, Cangzhou, Yangquan, Dezhou, Xinji, Zhengding and Luquan.

Taxi 
Taxi stations are set on the arrival floor of both terminal 1 and 2. The expense is determined by meter. It usually costs around ¥100 from Zhongshandonglu Air Ticket Office to airport.

See also
 List of airports in China
 List of the busiest airports in China

References

External links
 Official website

Airports in Hebei
Buildings and structures in Shijiazhuang
Airports established in 1995
1995 establishments in China